Iron Mountain Trail is a 1953 American Western film directed by William Witney and written by Gerald Geraghty. The film stars Rex Allen, Slim Pickens, Grant Withers, Nan Leslie, Roy Barcroft and Forrest Taylor. The film was released on May 8, 1953, by Republic Pictures.

Plot

Cast
Rex Allen as Rex Allen
Koko as Koko 
Slim Pickens as Slim Pickens
Grant Withers as Roger McCall
Nan Leslie as Nancy Sawyer
Roy Barcroft as Mate Orrin
Forrest Taylor as Sam Sawyer
Al Bridge as The Marshal 
John Hamilton as Circuit Judge
George Lloyd as John Brockway

References

External links 
 

1953 films
American Western (genre) films
1953 Western (genre) films
Republic Pictures films
Films directed by William Witney
American black-and-white films
1950s English-language films
1950s American films